Vaikka minä muutuin is the second studio album by Finnish singer Jesse Kaikuranta. Produced by Matti Mikkola and Eppu Kosonen, the album was released on 30 October 2013 and peaked at number seven on the Finnish Albums Chart.

Track listing

Charts and certifications

Charts

Certifications

Release history

References

2013 albums
Jesse Kaikuranta albums
Finnish-language albums